Xanthoparmelia callifolioides is a foliose lichen that belongs to the genus Xanthoparmelia.

Description 
Xanthoparmelia callifolioides grows to around 5–10 cm in diameter with broad light green lobes that are 1.5-3mm wide. Found to grow on small stones, pebbles, and nearby soil. Backside contains moderate collections of patchy simple rhizines that are approximately 1–2 mm long. A close relative is the lichen Xanthoparmelia taractica

Habitat and range 
Xanthoparmelia callifolioides is found mostly in the southern hemisphere, including Argentina, Australia, Bolivia, and Chile.

Chemistry 
Xanthoparmelia callifolioides is known to contain usnic acid.

See also 

 List of Xanthoparmelia species

References 

callifolioides
Lichen species
Lichens of Australia
Lichens of South America
Lichens described in 1988